The following lists events that happened during 2001 in the Democratic Republic of São Tomé and Príncipe.

Incumbents
President: Miguel Trovoada
Prime Minister: Miguel Trovoada (until 2 September), Fradique de Menezes (from 3 September)

Events
21 February: the Joint Development Authority with Nigeria was signed
26 April: the Maritime border agreement with Gabon was signed
29 July: The presidential election took place
Force for Change Democratic Movement – Liberal Party (MDFM-PL) founded
3 September: Fradique de Menezes becomes president of São Tomé and Príncipe
8 December: Fradique de Menezes issued a decree dissolving the Parliament

Sports
Bairros Unidos FC won the São Tomé and Príncipe Football Championship

References

 
Years of the 21st century in São Tomé and Príncipe
2000s in São Tomé and Príncipe
São Tomé and Príncipe
São Tomé and Príncipe